Hollie Florance (née Grima, born 16 December 1983 in Launceston, Tasmania) is an Australian women's basketball player. She is 190 cm tall, weighs 84 kg and plays in the Centre position. She attended the Australian Institute of Sport in 2000 to 2002. She was named the WNBL MVP during the 2006–07 season playing for the Bulleen Boomers. During the 2007/08 season she played offshore in the Italian Serie A League suiting up for Italmoka Pozzuoli. She has represented her country on numerous occasions, debuting at the 2002 World Championships in China where the Australian team won bronze. She has also won a silver medal at the 2008 Olympics after missing out on selection during the 2004 Olympics. She was also part of the Australian team that won the gold medal at the world championships in 2006 and the 2006 Commonwealth Games in Melbourne. Hollie is of Maltese heritage.

Personal life
In mid-2011, Grima was diagnosed with adenocarcinoma in situ, an early form of cervical cancer. As a result, she retired from international basketball, and announced that it is unlikely that she would be involved in the 2012 London Olympics.

She is the sister of Australian rules footballers Nathan, Todd and Alex Grima.

See also
 Australia women's national basketball team
 WNBL Most Valuable Player Award, (season 2006/07)
 WNBL Top Shooter Award, (season 2006/07)
 WNBL All-Star Five, (season 2006/07)

References

 Beijing 2008 Athlete Profile

External links
 

1983 births
Living people
Australian women's basketball players
Australian people of Maltese descent
Centers (basketball)
Olympic basketball players of Australia
Olympic silver medalists for Australia
Basketball players at the 2008 Summer Olympics
Basketball players at the 2006 Commonwealth Games
Commonwealth Games gold medallists for Australia
Olympic medalists in basketball
Melbourne Boomers players
Australian Institute of Sport basketball (WNBL) players
Medalists at the 2008 Summer Olympics
Sportspeople from Launceston, Tasmania
Sportswomen from Tasmania
Commonwealth Games medallists in basketball
21st-century Australian women
Medallists at the 2006 Commonwealth Games